AEC Tournament may refer to the championship of any sport sponsored by the Atlantic 10 Conference, including the following:
America East Conference men's basketball tournament
America East Conference baseball tournament
America East Conference women's basketball tournament